Massimo Giacoppo (born 10 May 1983) is an Italian water polo player, part of the Italian team that won the silver medal at the 2012 Summer Olympics.

Achievements

See also
 List of Olympic medalists in water polo (men)

References

External links
 

1983 births
Living people
Sportspeople from Messina
Italian male water polo players
Water polo drivers
Water polo players at the 2012 Summer Olympics
Medalists at the 2012 Summer Olympics
Olympic silver medalists for Italy in water polo